Georgeville may refer to:

United States
Georgeville, Minnesota 
Georgeville, Missouri

Canada
Georgeville, Nova Scotia